Hastings North was a federal electoral district represented in the House of Commons of Canada from 1867 to 1904. It was located in the province of Ontario. It was created by the British North America Act of 1867 which divided the County of Hastings into three ridings: Hastings West, Hastings East and Hastings North.

The North Riding consisted of the Townships of Rawdon, Huntingdon, Madoc, Elzevir, Tudor, Marmora and Lake, and the Village of Stirling, and any other surveyed Townships lying to the North of the said North Riding.

The electoral district was abolished in 1903 when it was redistributed between Hastings West and Hastings East ridings.

Election results

|}

|}

|}

On Mr. Bowell being named Minister of Customs, 19 October 1878:

|}

|}

|}

|}

On Mr. Bowell being called to the Senate, 5 December 1892:

|}

|}

See also 

 List of Canadian federal electoral districts
 Past Canadian electoral districts

External links 
Riding history from the Library of Parliament

Former federal electoral districts of Ontario